"My Special Angel" is a popular song by Jimmy Duncan, published in 1957.

It was first recorded by the Sonny Land Trio and released by them in 1957, and was a crossover hit that year for Bobby Helms.  "My Special Angel," which Bobby Helms recorded in July 1957, peaked at number seven on the Billboard Hot 100 chart and spent four weeks at number one on the US Country music chart. The single made the R&B chart as well, topping out at number eight. Backing vocals were sung by the Anita Kerr Singers.

Notable cover versions
In the United Kingdom, a version recorded by Malcolm Vaughan spent 14 weeks on the charts, peaking at number three in 1957.
The song was revived in 1968 by the Vogues, with their version reaching number seven on the Hot 100 chart and faring even better on the Easy Listening chart, where it spent two weeks at number one in October 1968.

Other cover versions
 The Four Preps on their album How To Succeed in Love (If You’re Really Trying) (1958).
 Keely Smith on her album Because You’re Mine (1962).
 Bill Haley on his album Bill Haley and His Comets (1960) Warner Bros. WS-1378.
Bobby Vinton on his album "The Greatest Hits of the Golden Groups" (1963)

Charts

Bobby Helms version

Malcolm Vaughan

The Vogues version

See also
List of CHUM number-one singles of 1957
List of number-one country singles of 1957 (U.S.)
List of number-one adult contemporary singles of 1968 (U.S.)

References

External links
 
 

1957 singles
1968 singles
Bobby Helms songs
The Vogues songs
Songs written by Jimmy Duncan (songwriter)
1957 songs
Song recordings produced by Dick Glasser